All for You may refer to:

Music

Albums 
 All for You (Annihilator album), and the title song (see below), 2004
 All for You (Janet Jackson album), and the title song (see below), 2001
 All for You (Show Lo album), 2011
 All for You (Titanium album), and the title song, 2012
 All for You (EP), and the title song, by Sechs Kies, 2020
 All for You: a Dedication to the Nat King Cole Trio, by Diana Krall, 1996
 The Best of Cold Chisel, subtitled All for You, 2011

Songs 
 "All for You" (1943 song), 1943
 "All for You" (Ace of Base song), 2010
 "All for You" (Janet Jackson song), 2001
 "All for You" (Kate Ryan song), 2006
 "All for You" (Namie Amuro song), 2004
 "All for You" (Sister Hazel song), 1997
 "All for You", by Annihilator from The One
 "All for You", by Black Label Society from Stronger than Death
 "All for You", by Goodnight Nurse from Always and Never
 "All for You", by Little Brother from The Minstrel Show
 "All for You", by Motörhead from  Rock 'n' Roll
 "All for You", by Opshop from Until the End of Time
 "All for You", by Our Lady Peace from Gravity
 "All for You", by Vaeda from State of Nature
 "All for You", by Wilkinson
 "All for You", by Years & Years from Palo Santo
 "All for You", from the musical Seussical

Other uses 
 All for You Tour, a 2001 tour by Janet Jackson
 "All for You", a Star Wars Tales story collected in Star Wars Tales Volume 5

See also
 All 4 U (disambiguation)